Saber Azizi (born 13 January 1996) is an Afghan professional footballer who plays as a midfielder for Ariana FC.

Club career
Born in Sweden, Azizi joined BK Olympic youth academy. He made his debut against Norrby IF for Landskrona BoIS.

Arian FC
Azizi joined Ariana FC – a club from Malmö founded by Afghan immigrants – in July 2018.

International career
In September 2016, he received his first call-up to the Afghanistan senior side for the friendly against Lebanon.

In October 2017, he played his first competitive game for Afghanistan, against Jordan in the qualification for the 2019 AFC Asian Cup.

Career statistics

References

External links
 
 

1996 births
Living people
Association football midfielders
Afghan men's footballers
Afghanistan international footballers
Swedish footballers
Swedish people of Afghan descent
Sportspeople of Afghan descent
BK Olympic players
Landskrona BoIS players
FC Rosengård 1917 players
Footballers from Malmö